XEZD-AM (1350 kHz) is a  Mexican Spanish-language radio station that serves the Ciudad Camargo, Tamaulipas area.

History
XEZD received its concession on January 4, 1962. It was owned by Román Garza Sánchez and initially operated on 1400 kHz before moving to 1350 within a few years of signing on. The concession was transferred to Radio Camargo, S.A., in 1982.

In 2017, station group Grupo Mi Radio became known as Corporativo Radiofónico de México after it was sold by Roberto Chapa Zavala to businessman Luis Alfredo Biassi.

External links

References

Spanish-language radio stations
Radio stations in Tamaulipas